Abilio may refer to:

 Abilio James Acosta (born 1971), American journalist
 Abílio Brandão (fl. 1948), Portuguese sports shooter
 Abílio Cabral (born 1960), Angolan boxer
 Abílio Cossa (1922–2003), Mozambican journalist and writer
 Abílio Duarte (1931–1996), Cape Verdean nationalist and politician
 Abilio Diniz (born 1936), Brazilian businessman
 Abilio Estévez (born 1954), Cuban novelist and playwright
 Abílio Fernandes (1906–1994), Portuguese botanist and taxonomist
 Abilio Manuel Guerra Junqueiro (1850–1923), Portuguese civil servant
 Abílio Novais (born 1967), Portuguese footballer
 Abílio Vieira (born 1999), Timorese football forward
 Abílio (footballer) (Abílio Neves dos Reis, born 1975), Brazilian football forward 
 Tanela (Abílio Filipe Antunes Teixeira, born 1988), Portuguese footballer 

Portuguese masculine given names